Franco Squillari was the defending champion but lost in the quarterfinals to Bohdan Ulihrach.

Jiří Novák won in the final 6–4, 7–5 against Antony Dupuis.

Seeds

  Yevgeny Kafelnikov (first round)
  Thomas Enqvist (second round)
  Franco Squillari (quarterfinals)
  Wayne Ferreira (first round)
  Thomas Johansson (second round)
  Marcelo Ríos (second round)
  Hicham Arazi (withdrew)
  Sjeng Schalken (second round)

Draw

Finals

Top half

Bottom half

External links
 2001 BMW Open Singles draw

2001 ATP Tour
2001 BMW Open